The 1997 IAAF World Cross Country Championships took place on 23 March 1997.  The races were held at the Parco del Valentino in Torino, Italy.  A report of the event was given in The New York Times, in the Herald, and for the IAAF.

Complete results for senior men, junior men, senior women, junior women, medallists, and the results of British athletes who took part were published.

Medallists

Race results

Senior men's race (12.333 km)

†: Athlete marked in the results list as nonscorer.

Note: Athletes in parentheses did not score for the team result

Junior men's race (8.511 km)

Note: Athletes in parentheses did not score for the team result

Senior women's race (6.6 km)

Note: Athletes in parentheses did not score for the team result

Junior women's race (4.689 km)

Note: Athletes in parentheses did not score for the team result

Medal table (unofficial)

Note: Totals include both individual and team medals, with medals in the team competition counting as one medal.

Participation
An unofficial count yields the participation of 725 athletes from 72 countries.  This is in agreement with the official numbers as published. Although announced, athletes from  did not show.

 (23)
 (1)
 (2)
 (3)
 (17)
 (5)
 (14)
 (3)
 (19)
 (2)
 (1)
 (6)
 (23)
 (1)
 (4)
 (9)
 (10)
 (2)
 (2)
 (4)
 (5)
 (1)
 (7)
 (27)
 (16)
 (27)
 (5)
 (1)
 (20)
 (18)
 (10)
 (3)
 (27)
 (3)
 (22)
 (2)
 (28)
 (3)
 (10)
 (2)
 (8)
 (12)
 (18)
 (21)
 (10)
 (13)
 (11)
 (3)
 (2)
 (17)
 (13)
 (12)
 (6)
 (1)
 (4)
 (2)
 (4)
 (27)
 (26)
 (2)
 (9)
 (3)
 (7)
 (19)
 (5)
 (4)
 (3)
 (27)
 (27)
 (11)
 (5)
 (5)

See also
 1997 IAAF World Cross Country Championships – Senior men's race
 1997 IAAF World Cross Country Championships – Junior men's race
 1997 IAAF World Cross Country Championships – Senior women's race
 1997 IAAF World Cross Country Championships – Junior women's race
 1997 in athletics (track and field)

References

External links 
The World Cross Country Championships 1973-2005
Official site

 
1997
Cross Country Championships
C
Sports competitions in Turin
International athletics competitions hosted by Italy
Cross country running in Italy
IAAF World Cross Country Championships
IAAF World Cross Country Championships, 1997